Vitālijs Pavlovs (born 17 June 1989) is a Latvian professional ice hockey player who is currently playing for the HK Dukla Michalovce of the Slovak Extraliga.

Playing career
Pavlovs signed a two-year contract with Dinamo Riga on August 9, 2012 and made his debut on December 5, 2012, in a loss to Yugra. Pavlovs started the 2012–13 season with Jokipojat in Mestis, he had 6 goals and 8 assists in 19 games which is good for 3rd place in points inside the team.

Pavlovs was sanctioned by the International Olympics Committee for failing an anti-doping test in the 2014 Sochi Winter Olympics. He tested positive for methylhexanamine, a banned stimulant found in certain food supplements.

On October 1, 2014, Pavlovs left Dinamo as a free agent to sign his first North American contract on a one-year deal with the Colorado Eagles of the ECHL.

Career statistics

Regular season and playoffs

International

References

External links

1989 births
Colorado Eagles players
Dinamo Riga players
Doping cases in ice hockey
HK Liepājas Metalurgs players
Ice hockey players at the 2014 Winter Olympics
Latvian ice hockey forwards
Latvian sportspeople in doping cases
Living people
Olympic ice hockey players of Latvia
Ice hockey people from Riga
HK Dukla Michalovce players
Latvian expatriate sportspeople in Russia
Latvian expatriate sportspeople in Finland
Latvian expatriate sportspeople in Kazakhstan
Latvian expatriate sportspeople in the United States
Latvian expatriate sportspeople in Austria
Latvian expatriate sportspeople in Slovakia
Expatriate ice hockey players in Russia
Expatriate ice hockey players in Finland
Expatriate ice hockey players in Kazakhstan
Expatriate ice hockey players in the United States
Expatriate ice hockey players in Austria
Expatriate ice hockey players in Slovakia
Latvian expatriate ice hockey people